Nilton Varela Lopes (born 25 May 2001) is a Portuguese professional footballer who plays as a defender for  FC Porto B in Liga Portugal 2.

Club career
Varela alternated between Lisbon-based clubs Sporting CP and C.F. Os Belenenses in his youth. He made his professional debut with Belenenses SAD in a 2–0 Primeira Liga loss away to Sporting on 10 November 2019. The following 26 January, he scored his first goal in a 2–1 home win over Portimonense SC, with his uncle scoring the other. He was a regular in the second half of the season as Petit replaced Pedro Ribeiro as manager, earning his place from unrelated Spaniard Francisco Varela.

In March 2022, Portugal's Constitutional Court ordered B-SAD to pay over €30,000 in compensation to C.F. Os Belenenses for his development as a player.

Varela transferred to FC Porto B on 19 August 2022, on a two-year deal.

International career
Born in Portugal, Varela is of Cape Verdean descent. He represented the Cape Verde under-19 teams in a friendly 2–0 loss to the Portuguese equivalent on 30 January 2019. He then switched to represent the latter, making an appearance in a 3–1 win over France under-19 on 25 February 2020.

Personal life
Varela made his professional debut for Belenenses SAD alongside his uncle Silvestre Varela, a winger who played mainly for FC Porto and was a long-time international for Portugal. He was also his teammate at Porto B.

References

External links
 
 FPF Profile
 ForadeJogo statistics

2001 births
Living people
People from Amadora
Sportspeople from Lisbon District
Portuguese footballers
Portugal youth international footballers
Cape Verdean footballers
Portuguese people of Cape Verdean descent
Belenenses SAD players
FC Porto B players
Primeira Liga players
Liga Portugal 2 players
Association football defenders